Franklin Canal can refer to:

Franklin Canal Company, see Lake Shore and Michigan Southern Railway
Franklin Canal, irrigation canal in Texas, see Franklin Canal (Texas)